United Nations Security Council resolution 1573, adopted unanimously on 16 November 2004, after reaffirming previous resolutions on East Timor (Timor-Leste), particularly resolutions 1410 (2002), 1473 (2003), 1480 (2003) and 1543 (2004), the Council extended the mandate of the United Nations Mission of Support to East Timor (UNMISET) for a final six months until 20 May 2005.

Resolution

Observations
The Security Council praised the efforts of the East Timorese government and people in developing institutions for an independent state including infrastructure, public administration, law enforcement and defence capabilities, though it noted it had not yet achieved self-sufficiency in some of these areas. The work of UNMISET and the progress it had made was also praised in this regard. Furthermore, the Council welcomed good relations between East Timor and neighbouring countries.

Acts
The mandate of UNMISET was extended for a final period of six months at its existing size and composition as described in Resolution 1543.  UNMISET was asked to focus on its exit strategy in order to return responsibility to the Timorese authorities. Meanwhile, the donor community was called upon to continue providing assistance to East Timor and for United Nations agencies to help in the transition from a peacekeeping mission to a sustainable development framework.

The resolution also reaffirmed the need to combat impunity and the Secretary-General Kofi Annan was asked to closely monitor the situation.

See also
 1999 East Timorese crisis
 East Timor Special Autonomy Referendum
 Indonesian occupation of East Timor
 List of United Nations Security Council Resolutions 1501 to 1600 (2003–2005)
 United Nations Transitional Administration in East Timor

References

External links
 
Text of the Resolution at undocs.org

 1573
2004 in East Timor
 1573
November 2004 events